Pedicularia deshayesiana is a species of sea snail, a marine gastropod mollusk in the family Pediculariidae, one of the families of cowry allies.

References

 Landau B. & Fehse D. (2004). The early Pliocene Gastropoda (Mollusca) of Estepona, southern Spain. Part 3: Trivioidea and Cypraeoidea. Palaeontos. 5: 1-34.

External links
  Seguenza G. (1865). Description d'un Pedicularia fossile. Journal de Conchyliologie. 13: 58-61, pl. 4

Pediculariinae